The 2014–15 Ligue 2 season was the 76th season since its establishment.

Teams
There were three promoted teams from Championnat National, replacing the three teams that were promoted to Ligue 1 following the 2013–14 season. A total of 20 teams competed in the league with three clubs relegated to the third division, the National. All clubs that secured Ligue 2 status for the season were subject to approval by the DNCG before becoming eligible to participate.

On 18 April 2014, Luzenac became the first team to secure a spot in the Ligue 2 following a 1–0 victory over Boulogne-sur-Mer, which gave them an advance on the 4th placed team, Red Star, that couldn't be surpassed in the last games. By gaining promotion for a professional level for the first time in its history, Luzenac, the club of a village of 600 inhabitants in Southern France, became the smallest club in the history of professional football in France.
Orléans was the second team to gain promotion to Ligue 2 on 2 May after a 2–0 victory against Paris FC. This marked a return for Orléans in the professional leagues after a twenty-two-years absence. Gazélec Ajaccio was the third and last team to achieve promotion on 9 May 2014. This means that for the first time since the 1997–98 season, a Derby of Ajaccio will be contested between Gazélec and AC Ajaccio.

On 20 April, Ajaccio officially suffered relegation from Ligue 1 after a 2–1 defeat in the Derby Corse against archrivals Bastia. This ended a three-year stint for Ajaccio in Ligue 1.  Valenciennes FC were the second team to suffer relegation on 4 May. On 5 June, Luzenac's promotion was revoked by DNCG for financial reasons, but the club decided to appeal.

On 25 June, the DNCG relegated Valenciennes FC to the Championnat National because of their approximate amount of €8 million in debts, this allowing Châteauroux to remain in Ligue 2.
On 4 July, DNCG confirmed its denial of Luzenac's promotion despite the appeal, allowing Istres also to remain in Ligue 2. On 11 July the ruling against Valenciennes FC was revoked and FC Istres was once again relegated. Luzenac was found to have an inadequate stadium, thus they were denied promotion. They were also denied re-entry to the Championnat National, so they later entered the regional leagues.

Stadia and locations

Number of teams by regions

Personnel and kits

1Subject to change during the season.

Managerial changes

League table

Results

Season statistics

Top goalscorers

Source: Official Goalscorers' Standings

Top assists

Source: Official Assists' Table

References

Ligue 2 seasons
2
Fra